The following events happened during 1948 in the Kingdom of Belgium.

Incumbents
Monarch – Leopold III, with Prince Charles as regent
Prime Minister – Paul-Henri Spaak

Events

 1 January – Benelux Customs Convention comes into force.
 17 March – Belgium, France, Luxembourg, the Netherlands, and the United Kingdom sign the Treaty of Brussels, establishing the Brussels Pact for economic, social and cultural collaboration and collective self-defence.
 29 May – Alfred De Taeye's bill to incentivise the building of new homes passes. 
 23 July – Association belge des familles des disparus foundeed
 22 August – Order in Council for the implementation of the De Taeye Act.
 25 August – Treaty of Brussels, establishing the Brussels Pact for economic, social and cultural collaboration and collective self-defence, comes into effect.
 8 October – Agreement of Belgium and Luxembourg with the United States for exchanges under the Fulbright Program.

Publications
 Belgisch Staatsblad/Moniteur belge
 Jean Lejeune, Principauté de Liège

Deaths
 17 September – Prosper Dezitter (born 1893), wartime collaborator

References

 
1940s in Belgium
Belgium
Belgium
Years of the 20th century in Belgium